Valentin and Valentina is a 1985 Soviet drama film directed by Georgy Natanson.

Plot 
The film tells about an eighteen-year-old guy and girl who understand that love is not only a bright and romantic feeling, but also a lot of spiritual work.

Cast 
 Marina Zudina as Valentina
 Nikolay Stotskiy as Valentin
 Tatyana Doronina as Valentina's mother
 Nina Ruslanova as Valentin's mother
 Zinaida Dekhtyaryova as Valentina's grandmother
 Larisa Udovichenko as Zhenya
 Boris Shcherbakov as Sasha Gusev
 Lyusyena Ovchinnikova as Rita
 Valeri Khlevinsky as Volodya
 Yuri Vasilyev as Slava

References

External links 
 

1985 films
1980s Russian-language films
Soviet drama films
1985 drama films
Soviet teen films